Peer Koopmeiners (born 4 May 2000) is a Dutch professional footballer who plays as a midfielder for Excelsior, on loan from AZ Alkmaar.

Club career
On 17 October 2020, Koopmeiners netted his first professional goal, in a 3–2 away defeat at the hands of Jong Ajax. On 2 February 2021, he scored a bullet free-kick that helped Jong AZ to a 3–2 victory against fellow second-tier side FC Eindhoven.

On 23 June 2021, he was promoted into the first team.

On 10 January 2023, Koopmeiners was loaned by Excelsior.

Personal life
He is a younger brother of Dutch international Teun Koopmeiners.

Career statistics

Club

Notes

References

External links
 Career stats - Voetbal International

2000 births
Living people
Footballers from Amsterdam
Dutch footballers
Netherlands youth international footballers
Association football midfielders
AZ Alkmaar players
Jong AZ players
Excelsior Rotterdam players
Eerste Divisie players
Eredivisie players